The Air Power Park is an outdoor, roadside museum in Hampton, Virginia which recognizes Hampton's role in America's early space exploration and aircraft testing. The outdoor park is open year-round, seven days a week from sunrise to sunset. Several vintage aircraft and experimental space launch vehicles from the 1950s and 1960s are displayed out of doors. The park is on a  plot and includes a children's playground.

The indoor museum at the center of the park was reopened after a 2011 renovation (with hours more limited than the outdoor part of the park). There are eight themed rooms containing over 325 models of aircraft, space craft, and nautical vessels representing all the U.S. branches of service as well as various model craft from other nations.  The park also has a time capsule

Indoor museum
 
NASA Room
United States Air Force Aviation Room- Including items highlighting nearby Langley Air Force Base's contribution to the USAF.
General Aviation Room
Library
Cold War Era Room
International Plastic Modellers' Society Room- containing periodically rotating display of local IPMS member's models.
United States Navy Room
United States Army Aviation Branch Room

On display

The following are listed as on display:

 P.1127 Kestrel
 F-86L Sabre
 Mercury capsule
 A-7E Corsair II
 F-101F Voodoo
 F-89J Scorpion
 RF-4C Phantom II
 F-105D Thunderchief
 T-33A Trainer
 Jupiter IRBM
 Nike SAM
 Nike Ajax SAM
 Nike Hercules SAM
 F-100D Super Sabre
 Polaris A-2 SLBM
 Corporal IRBM
 Little Joe/Mercury, booster used in testing for the Mercury program.  Launched from Wallops Flight Facility, 90 miles north.

See also
 List of aerospace museums
 Rocket garden

References

External links 

 Air Power Park - City of Hampton
 RF-4c Phantom II – Aviation Enthusiast Corner
 Roadside America
 Air Power Park on Aviation Museum Locator
 wikimapia.org - satellite map view (with clickable aircraft info)

Aerospace museums in Virginia
Crewed spacecraft
Military and war museums in Virginia
Virginia municipal and county parks
Museums in Hampton, Virginia
Parks in Hampton, Virginia
Open-air museums in Virginia
Time capsules